The Coltzin petroglyph, located approximately 65 km north of Mazatlán, Mexico, is approximately 8 m in diameter, carved into a cliff.  It looks somewhat like a solstice wheel, but its meaning not known.

Buildings and structures in Sinaloa
Petroglyphs in Mexico
Rock art in North America